Tuam Stars are a Gaelic football team based in Tuam, County Galway.

History

In December 1887 Tuam's first football  club was formed as an Association football team. In February 1889 the club switched to Gaelic football under the name Tuam Stars. They played their first game on St. Patrick's Day of that year.

Honours

Galway Senior Football Championships: 0
Connacht Senior Club Football Championship: 0
Galway Senior Football Leagues: 0

Galway Minor Football Club Championships: 0
Galway Under-21 County Championship:0

Notable players 
Seán Purcell - All-Ireland Medal Winner with Galway in 1956 and member of the GAA Team of the Century and GAA and Galway Teams of the Millennium
Frank Stockwell - All-Ireland Medal Winner with Galway in 1956 and member of the Galway Team of the Millennium

Jack Mangan - Captain of the Galway All-Ireland Winning team of 1956
Cyril Kelly - All-Ireland Medal Winner with Galway in 1956 and current Vice-President of the club
Mick Garrett - All-Ireland Medal Winner with Galway in 1964 and 1965
P. J. Smyth - 1971 All-Star winner
Johnny Carey - 1971 All-Star winner
Pat O'Neill - All-Ireland runner-up with Galway in 1983
Jarlath Fallon - All-Ireland Medal Winner with Galway in 1998 and 2001 and footballer of the year in 1998.
Paul Doherty - Former Inter-County Goalkeeper for  Galway
Conor Doherty - Minor All Ireland winner 2007, U-21 All Ireland winner 2011, current member of Galway Senior Football panel
Gary O'Donnell - Current member of Galway senior football panel

See also
Seán Purcell
Frank Stockwell
Galway Senior Football Championship

References

External links
Official Club Website
Tuam Stadium History

Gaelic games clubs in County Galway
Gaelic football clubs in County Galway
Sport in Tuam